Chandrasena Perera Jayasuriya (born 27 January 1935, date of death unknown) was a Sri Lankan boxer. He competed in the men's lightweight event at the 1956 Summer Olympics.

References

External links
 

1935 births
Year of death missing
Sri Lankan male boxers
Olympic boxers of Sri Lanka
Boxers at the 1956 Summer Olympics
Place of birth missing (living people)
Asian Games medalists in boxing
Boxers at the 1954 Asian Games
Asian Games bronze medalists for Sri Lanka
Medalists at the 1954 Asian Games
Lightweight boxers